Piotr Paweł Żyła (born 16 January 1987) is a Polish ski jumper. He is a member of the national team and competed at the 2014 Winter Olympics in Sochi. He is the 2021 and 2023 World Champion on the normal hill, a bronze medalist of 2017 World Championships in individual large hill event, 2017 World Champion and a two-time World Championship bronze medalist (2013, 2015) and in the team large hill event, also the two time Ski Flying World Championships bronze medalist in team (2018, 2020).

Personal life
Piotr Żyła was born in Cieszyn, Poland. He graduated Sports Championships School in Zakopane, where his classmate was Kamil Stoch. In 2006 he married Justyna Lazar, Adam Małysz's cousin. Piotr and Justyna have two children: son Jakub (born 2007), who is training ski jumping, and daughter Karolina (born 2012). In November 2018 they divorced.

Career

2006/2007
Żyła jumped on skis for the first time when he was eight years old. On 26 December 2004, he debuted in the Continental Cup at St. Moritz. The first points in this series were won on 14 January 2005 in Sapporo, when he was 19th. At the World Junior Championships, he was 14th, while the team won the silver medal. On 21 January in Sapporo, he got a chance to debut in the World Cup. In his first start, he scored points (19th place). A day later, again, the last time in the season, he was in the top 30. On 4 February, he won the Continental Cup in Villach. In the 2006/2007 season, he scored points in the World Cup four times. The highest place was the 19th in Titisee-Neustadt. He started well in the world championships. In the individual competition, he was 35th and 42nd. In the team competition, the Polish team was 5th.

2007/2008
In the season 2007/2008, he scored points just in Zakopane, Poland. He was 29th twice.

2010/2011
Training with coach Jan Szturc at the club meant he had better results in the Continental Cup. On 21 January in Zakopane was 21st, he repeated this result on 13 February at the ski flying hill in Vikersund. On 29 January 2011, he stood on the podium in the team competition in Willingen. He also starred in the World Championships. He finished 19th and 21st place individually and fourth and fifth in the team.

2011/2012
In the season 2011/2012, Żyła returned to team A. In the general classification beginning the summer season competitions, Lotus Poland Tour finished in last – 57th place. In the event of the Summer Grand Prix 2011 in Hakuba finished in second place twice. On 17 September, Wielka Krokiew won the bronze medal in Polish Championship after jumping a distance of 126.5 m and 118.5 m. After taking 4th place in the Summer Grand Prix in Klingenthal, he had the fifth position in the general classification of the Summer Grand Prix 2011.

2012/2013
On 4 December 2011, for the first time, he was ranked in the top 10. He was 7th in Lillehammer. He started in the World Cup Ski Flying in Vikersund. Individually he was 33rd, and the Polish team took 7th place. On 26 January 2013, he became the Polish record holder (with Kamil Stoch) in the length of the ski flight (232.5 m). In 2012/2013, he first scored the World Cup points at the seventh start, taking 30th place in Garmisch-Partenkirchen. On 9 January 2013, he took 6th place in Wisla. He repeated this result on 26 January in Vikersund and 13 February in Klingenthal. In the individual competitions at FIS Nordic World Ski Championships 2013, he took 23rd place on the normal hill and 19th on the large hill. On 2 March 2013 he won there a bronze medal in team competition with teammates: Kamil Stoch, Maciej Kot, Dawid Kubacki. The primary outcome of the competition was that his team took fourth place, but after recounting the scores because of Thomas Morgenstern, who noticed a mistake in points and at the request of the Germans, they finished in third place (Norway was in front of the Polish, but Bardal's jump was badly counted). On 17 March 2013 annually ex aequo with Gregor Schlierenzauer won the World Cup in Oslo. It was the first podium of his career. He was the fifth in the history of Polish ski jumpers after Stanisław Bobak, Piotr Fijas, Adam Małysz and Kamil Stoch, who won the World Cup competition. A week later, the penultimate competition of the season ranked third in the ski flying hill in Planica.

2014/2015
He took part in the World Championships 2015 in Falun, Sweden. He was 33rd on the normal hill (K-90) and 9th in the competition on the large hill Lugnet (K-120). On 28 February 2015 Polish team in squad: Żyła, Kamil Stoch, Klemens Murańka and Jan Ziobro achieved the bronze medal of World Championships 2015 in team. For Żyła, this was the second bronze of World Championships in team.

2016/2017
On 3 December 2016 Polish national team including Żyła, Stoch, Kubacki and Kot won first competition in team for Poland in history. Żyła took part in 2016–17 Four Hills Tournament and finished 2nd in overall rankings, losing only to Stoch.

In Zakopane Polish team, including Stoch, Kubacki, Kot, Żyła achieved second place in team competition. On 28 January 2017 Poland won their second team competition in history in Willingen.

On 4 March 2017 Polish national team, including Żyła, Kubacki, Kot and Stoch, achieved first in history title of 2017 World Champions in the team event. They beat Norway and Austria at Salpausselkä K116 in Lahti, Finland.

2017/2018
On 21 January 2018 coach Horngacher officially appointed Żyła to 2018 Winter Olympics. In the last competition before the Olympic Games, Żyła took 3rd place behind Stoch and Forfang. It was his fourth individual podium in career.

Despite his presence at 2018 Winter Olympics in Pyeongchang, he had the weakest results from the Polish team in training before both competitions on normal and large hills. Therefore, he was neither in any competition nor in the team that won the bronze medal.

Olympic Games

World Championships

Ski Flying World Championships

World Cup

Season standings

Individual starts

Victories

Podiums

Team victories

References

External links

1987 births
Living people
People from Cieszyn
Polish male ski jumpers
Polish Lutherans
Sportspeople from Silesian Voivodeship
Ski jumpers at the 2014 Winter Olympics
Ski jumpers at the 2022 Winter Olympics
Olympic ski jumpers of Poland
FIS Nordic World Ski Championships medalists in ski jumping
21st-century Polish people